Tomopleura bellardii is a species of sea snail, a marine gastropod mollusk in the family Borsoniidae.

Description
The length of the shell attains 11 mm. The white shell is spirally costate. The outer lip is crenulated, with a shallow sinus near the suture. The columellar lip shows a median plication. (described from an immature specimen) (described as Drillia bellardii)

Distribution
This marine species occurs off South Africa.

References

 Jousseaume, F. (1883). Description d’espèces et genres nouveaux de mollusques. Bulletin de la Société Zoologique de France. 8: 186–204, pl. 10
 R.N. Kilburn (1986), Turridae (Mollusca: Gastropoda) of southern Africa and Mozambique. Part 3. Subfamily Borsoniinae; Ann. Natal Mus. Vol. 27(2) pp. 633–720

External links
 

Endemic fauna of South Africa
bellardii
Gastropods described in 1883